Anthemius was Western Roman emperor from 467 to 472.

Anthemius may also refer to:

 Anthemius (praetorian prefect) (  400–414), Praetorian Prefect of the East and grandfather of the Western Emperor
 Anthemius Isidorus, Consul in 436
 Anthemiolus (after 453–  471), son of the Emperor, Roman general
 Procopius Anthemius (emperor's son), son of the Emperor and Eastern Roman politician
 Anthemius of Cyprus (  488), archbishop
 Anthemius of Tralles (  474–before 558), architect of Hagia Sophia
 Anthemius of Novgorod (13th century), a boy who lived in Novgorod and left his notes on the birch bark

See also
Anthimus (disambiguation)